Sthembiso Santo 'Stairs' Mhlongo (born 13 May 1987) is a South African rugby union player who last played for the . His regular position is lock.

Career

Youth and Varsity rugby

Mhlongo was part of the  Academy, but failed to represent them at any level. Instead, he moved to Pretoria in 2011, where he was part of the  side that participated in and reached the final of the 2011 Varsity Cup competition. His participation was limited however, making just three substitute appearances. He once again played for them in the 2012 Varsity Cup tournament, which saw  win the title for the first time. Mhlongo also saw more game time in 2012, appearing in every single match from the second round onwards. He scored one try (in their final regular season match against the ) and also played the final twenty minutes of the final, where the Pretoria side triumphed 29–21 against a  side that previously won the first three editions of the competition.

Border Bulldogs

Leopards

Mhlongo was a member of the  team that won the 2015 Currie Cup First Division. He featured in a total of ten matches during the 2015 Currie Cup qualification rounds and First Division proper. However, he didn't feature in the final, where the Leopards beat the  44–20 to win the competition for the first time in their history.

References

1987 births
Living people
Border Bulldogs players
Leopards (rugby union) players
Rugby union players from Pietermaritzburg
South African rugby union players
Rugby union locks
Falcons (rugby union) players